The 2022 British Academy Television Awards were held on 8 May 2022 at the Royal Festival Hall in London, to recognise the excellence in British television of 2021. The nominations were announced on 30 March 2022 alongside the nominations for the 2022 British Academy Television Craft Awards. The nominees for Must-See Moment, voted on by the public, were announced on 23 March 2022.

It was the first ceremony since the 2019 edition to be held with an in-person audience. Richard Ayoade returned as host for the third consecutive year.

Though It's a Sin was nominated for the most awards, with seven, including three in the same category (Best Supporting Actor), it won none. Three series won multiple awards: Big Zuu's Big Eats, Help, and Time each won two. Including Craft Awards, Landscapers was also nominated for seven awards; it won three (all Craft).

Rules changes
In October 2021, the British Academy of Film and Television Arts (BAFTA) announced several changes in its rules and voting system:
 Line Producers/Production Managers/Heads of Production are now elegible for nomination.
 UK performers appearing in the International category are now eligible for performance categories.
 For the International Programme category, the amount of nominees increased from four to six.
 International members can now vote across all applicable Television and Television Craft categories.

Winners and nominees
The nominations were announced on 30 March 2022.

Source:

Ceremony
The 2022 British Academy Television Awards were held at the Royal Festival Hall in London, returning to a fully in-person event with a full audience for the first time since the COVID-19 pandemic, with a traditional red carpet. Located in the South Bank, fans were also allowed to gather on the Hungerford Bridge pedestrian bridges to watch the red carpet. As well as nominees and others from the television industry, celebrities including sportspeople and musicians attended the ceremony. There were also actors portraying Squid Game characters in red suits. It was hosted by actor and comedian Richard Ayoade, for the third time; Ayoade revealed that he always reads a novel at the ceremony to keep calm, and this year was reading one by John Updike.

The BAFTA Fellowship award was given to Sir Billy Connolly. He joked that he is "such a happy man getting these good attendance medals now my career is out the window."

Actor Ncuti Gatwa, nominated for his role in Sex Education, had been announced as the fourteenth incarnation of The Doctor in Doctor Who, a much-anticipated casting announcement, shortly before the ceremony. He presented an award with co-star and fellow nominee Aimee Lou Wood, during which the pair joked about the casting.

Strictly Come Dancing, specifically dancer Giovanni Pernice and actress partner Rose Ayling-Ellis, won the "Must-See Moment" award for a moment of silence representing Ayling-Ellis' deafness during their dance to "Symphony". In their acceptance speech, a British Sign Language interpreter joined them on-stage. It was reported that some viewers complained to the BBC that this accessibility measure was only brought on stage at this moment, rather than throughout the show. The ceremony was also held at the end of deaf awareness week, with Ayling-Ellis saying that the timing of the award could reinforce the awareness campaign's intention "to educate people about how we can be more inclusive for deaf people all year round, because we're deaf all the time."

Celebrity chef Big Zuu won two awards, with his acceptance speeches being rambling and exuberant. Sophie Willan gave an "expletive-laden" acceptance speech. These were in contrast to some more serious speeches at the ceremony this year, including several referencing the COVID-19 pandemic as series about it won awards. Most acceptance speeches praised alternative public network Channel 4, following the government announcement that it is to be privatised. British Academy of Film and Television Arts chair Krishnendu Majumdar also gave a speech criticising the privatisation to open the ceremony; it also praised the television workers covering the war in Ukraine, and called for more diversity.

In Memoriam

Bamber Gascoigne CBE
Janice Long
Tom O'Connor
Lionel Blair
Gwyneth Guthrie
Jimmy Greaves MBE
Gerald Sinstadt
Geoff Hill
Betty White
Chelsie Whibley
Lynda Baron
Sir Antony Sher KBE
Tony Selby
Beryl Vertue CBE
David Frank
Una Stubbs
Anna Karen
Ben Roberts
George Rossi
Michael K. Williams
Barry Cryer OBE
Jana Bennett OBE
Linda Kahn
Jamal Edwards MBE
Roger Graef OBE
Kevin Billington
Anne Stallybrass
Peter Bowles
Sarah Harding
Tom Parker
John Challis
Gary Waldhorn
Sean Lock
June Brown OBE

See also
 2022 British Academy Television Craft Awards

References

External links
Official website

2022
2022 in British television
2022 television awards
2022 awards in the United Kingdom
May 2022 events in the United Kingdom
Royal Festival Hall